Georg Heimann (29 May 1905 – 1980) was a Swiss footballer who played for FC Basel. He played as midfielder.

Heimann joined Basel 1924, but in his first season he played only in four test games. He played his debut for the club in the first game of the 1925–26 Serie A season on 6 September 1925 against Solothurn. Between the years 1924 and 1929 Heimann played a total of 28 games for Basel without scoring a goal. 11 of these games were in the Swiss Serie A, one in the Swiss Cup and 16 were friendly games.

References

Sources
 Rotblau: Jahrbuch Saison 2017/2018. Publisher: FC Basel Marketing AG. 
 Die ersten 125 Jahre. Publisher: Josef Zindel im Friedrich Reinhardt Verlag, Basel. 
 Verein "Basler Fussballarchiv" Homepage

FC Basel players
Swiss men's footballers
Association football midfielders
1905 births
1980 deaths